KRJO (1680 AM, "99.7 The Legend") is an American radio station broadcasting a classic country music format. The station is licensed to Monroe, Louisiana and is owned by Holladay Broadcasting of Louisiana, LLC.   Studios are located in Monroe, and its transmitter is located east of Monroe.

History

KRJO originated as the expanded band "twin" of an existing station on the standard AM band.

On March 17, 1997, the Federal Communications Commission (FCC) announced that eighty-eight stations had been given permission to move to newly available "Expanded Band" transmitting frequencies, ranging from 1610 to 1700 kHz, with KMLB in  Monroe authorized to move from 1440 kHz to 1680 kHz.

A construction permit for the expanded band station was assigned the call letters KBJE on September 4, 1998. The FCC's initial policy was that both the original station and its expanded band counterpart could operate simultaneously for up to five years, after which owners would have to turn in one of the two licenses, depending on whether they preferred the new assignment or elected to remain on the original frequency. However, this deadline was extended multiple times, and both stations continued to be authorized beyond the initial time limit. The original KMLB on 1440 AM was eventually taken off the air, with its license surrendered to the FCC on March 4, 2008.

99.7 My FM

On July 11, 2016, KRJO changed formats from classic country to hot adult contemporary, branded as "99.7 My FM", simulcast on FM translator K259CU 99.7 FM Monroe.

Back to classic country
On April 5, 2020, KRJO reverted formats back to classic country, branded as "99.7 The Legend" after three years with hot adult contemporary

References

External links

Classic country radio stations in the United States
Radio stations in Louisiana
The Radio People radio stations